The 2016 Football Division 3  is the 1st season of the League competition since its establishment in 2016. It is in the fourth tier of the Thai football league system.

Northern Region

Teams

Format 
Group stage: A total 13 clubs will be divided into four groups of three clubs except group 4 which has four clubs to play round-robin matches at a neutral venue. The best two clubs of each group will qualify to the knock-out stage.

Knock-out stage: A total of 8 clubs which has qualified from the group stage will play single-elimination stage until there are only two finalists of the tournament.

First round

Group A

Group B

Group C

Group D

Quarter-finals Round

Semi-finals Round

Final round

North Eastern Region

Member clubs

Format 
Group stage: A total 10 clubs will be divided into four groups of three clubs except group 3 which has four clubs to play round-robin matches at a neutral venue. The best two clubs of group A and B, The best three clubs of group C and The best points of 3rd position in group A and B will qualify to the knock-out stage.

Knock-out stage: A total of 8 clubs which has qualified from the group stage will play single-elimination stage until there are only two finalists of the tournament.

First round

Group A

Group B

Group C

Quarter-finals Round

Semi-finals Round

Final round

Eastern Region

Member clubs

Format 
Group stage: A total 21 clubs will be divided into four groups of three clubs except group 7 which has four clubs to play round-robin matches at a neutral venue. The best clubs of group A and G qualify to Quarter-finals round of the knock-out stage. The best two clubs of group B, C, D, E, F and runner-up of group A and G will qualify to Second round of the knock-out stage.

Knock-out stage: A total of 14 clubs which has qualified from the group stage will play single-elimination stage until there are only two finalists of the tournament.

First round

Group A

Group B

Group C

Group D

Group E

Group F

Group G

Second round

Quarter-finals Round

Semi-finals Round

Final round

Central Region

Member clubs

Format 
Group stage: A total 54 clubs will be divided into four groups of three clubs except group 18 which has four clubs to play round-robin matches at a neutral venue. The best clubs of group A and G qualify to Quarter-finals round of the knock-out stage. The best clubs of group B, C, E, F, G and H, The best two clubs of group A, D, I, J, K, L, M, N, O, P, Q and R will qualify to third round of the knock-out stage. Runner-up of group E, F, G and H will qualify to second round of the knock-out stage.

Knock-out stage: A total of 18 clubs which has qualified from the group stage will play single-elimination stage until there are only two finalists of the tournament.

First round

Group A

Group B

Group C

Group D

Group E

Group F

Group G

Group H

Group I

Group J

Group K

Group L

Group M

Group N

Group O

Group P

Group Q

Group R

Second round

Third round

Fourth round

Quarter-finals Round

Semi-finals Round

Final round

Winner

Southern Region

Member clubs

Venue Stadium and locations (2016) 
All matches played in  Wiang Sa District, Surat Thani

Qualification format 
All four teams played a one-legged round-robin match. The best two teams advanced to the final round, and the winner of the final round was promoted to 2017 Thai Division 2 League.

First round

Final round

Winner

Champions list
Promoted to 2017 Thai League 4

See also
 2016 Thai League
 2016 Thai Division 1 League
 2016 Regional League Division 2
 2016 Thai Division 3 Tournament Northern Region
 2016 Thai Division 3 Tournament North Eastern Region
 2016 Thai Division 3 Tournament Central Region
 2016 Thai Division 3 Tournament Eastern Region
 2016 Thai Division 3 Tournament Southern Region
 2016 Thai FA Cup
 2016 Thai League Cup
 2016 Kor Royal Cup

References

Thai Football Division 3
4